Kai Meriluoto (born 2 January 2003) is a Finnish footballer who plays as a forward for Veikkausliiga side Ilves on loan from HJK.

Early life
Meriluoto was born in Siuntio, Finland, to a Japanese mother and Finnish father. When he was a one-year-old, he moved to Vienne, Isère, France, with his family and lived there for five years before returning to Finland. Meriluoto lived in China from when he was ten years old until he was twelve years old. He has dual citizenship of Finland and Japan, and he speaks Finnish, Japanese, French and English fluently. In 2021, Meriluoto moved back to France.

Club career
On 15 February 2022, Meriluoto joined Ilves on loan for the 2022 season.

Career statistics

Club

Notes

References

2003 births
Living people
Finnish people of Japanese descent
Finnish footballers
Finland international footballers
Finland youth international footballers
Association football forwards
Klubi 04 players
Helsingin Jalkapalloklubi players
FC Ilves players
Kakkonen players
Veikkausliiga players
Finnish expatriate sportspeople in France
Japanese people of Finnish descent